Patterson Creek Manor was a 9,000 acre (36 km²) land grant held by Lord Fairfax near present-day Burlington, Mineral County, West Virginia. Starting in 1738 about 30 farms were established here.

External links
 Early Land Grants and Settlers Along Patterson Creek

Northwestern Turnpike
Mineral County, West Virginia